An election to the County Council of London took place on 2 March 1895. The council was elected by First Past the Post with each elector having two votes in the two-member seats. The Moderates made numerous gains, and tied the Progressive Party in seats on the council.

Campaign
The Progressives campaigned on their record of running the council, arguing that they had achieved far more than the Metropolitan Board of Works had, and also that the various Metropolitan Borough Councils should be unified and their powers given to the London County Council. The Moderates argued that the Progressives had delayed in making improvements, and that measures should be taken to increase home ownership rates, rather than constructing council housing.

The Earl of Onslow, a prominent figure in the Conservative Party, was expected to stand for the Moderates in Islington South, but he was disqualified as his nomination papers were not received in time.

Results
The Moderates gained 23 seats from the Progressives, and lost only one seat to them, tying both parties on 59 seats.  Although the result was a tie, the Progressives held the majority of aldermanic seats on the council, and thus were able to retain control of it.

The Times argued that the result was worse for Progressives than initially appeared, as they had not only lost seats, but many of their formerly safe seats were now marginal.  The Daily Chronicle argued that the poor result for the Progressives was due to apathy among workers, and that their vote had held steady among the middle class.  In addition, it blamed the unsuccessful Independent Labour Party and Social Democratic Federation candidates for taking votes away from some Progressive candidates.

References

1895 elections in the United Kingdom
County Council election
London County Council election
London County Council elections
London County Council election